Orla Comerford (born 14 September 1997) is an Irish Paralympic athlete who competes in sprinting events in international level events.

References

1997 births
Living people
Sportspeople from County Dublin
Paralympic athletes of Ireland
Irish female sprinters
Athletes (track and field) at the 2016 Summer Paralympics
Athletes (track and field) at the 2020 Summer Paralympics
Medalists at the World Para Athletics European Championships